Hijra, Hijrah, Hegira, Hejira, Hijrat or Hijri may refer to:

Islam
 Hijrah (often written as Hejira in older texts), the migration of Muhammad from Mecca to Medina in 622 CE
 Migration to Abyssinia or First Hegira, of Muhammad's followers in 615 CE
 Lunar Hijri calendar (widely known as "the Islamic calendar", although there is more than one Islamic calendar), the lunar calendar used by the majority of Muslims
 Hijri year (AH), the number of a year in the Hijri calendar 
 Solar Hijri calendar, a solar Islamic calendar used primarily in Iran and Afghanistan

Literature
 Hijra, by the Malayalam poet Moyinkutty Vaidyar
Hegira (novel), by Greg Bear, 1979
Hegira, a fictional exodus from Earth in the Hyperion Cantos novels

Music
 Hejira (album),  by Joni Mitchell, 1976
 Hijrah, a 2016 album by George Hirsch

Other uses
 HIJRA (Humanitarian Initiative Just Relief Aid), an African organization
 Hijra (South Asia), a term for eunuchs, and intersex people
 Hijrat, a South Asian term for protest emigration
 Hijrat (film), Pakistani, 2016

See also
 Hijara, a board game
 Hiigara, in the computer game Homeworld